Chameera Sajith Kumara (born 31 March 1989) is a Sri Lankan international footballer who plays as a midfielder.

References

External links
Player profile from goal.com

Sri Lankan footballers
Living people
Sri Lanka international footballers
Sri Lanka Navy SC (football) players
1989 births
Association football midfielders
Sri Lanka Football Premier League players